Stanimir Kirilov Dimitrov is a Bulgarian footballer who currently plays as a forward for FC Vereya.

Dimitrov started football at age 8 in his home town of Plovdiv, playing with local club Maritsa Plovdiv. At 16, he signed his first contract with Maritsa Plovdiv, scoring his first goal for the team in his debut match. He played also for Spartak Plovdiv, Spartak Varna, Los Molinos, Atlético Sanluqueño, Panlefkadios, Hebar Pazardzhik and Vereya Stara Zagora.

References

External links
 
Левски повтори 7:1 точно 20 години след славния разгром над ЦСКА (ВИДЕО+СНИМКИ)

 https://telemedia.bg/bg/sport/futbol/stanimir-dimitrov-izbrah-hebyr-zashtoto-e-otbor-v-kojto-si-zaslujava-da-igraesh

Bulgarian footballers
Living people
1992 births
FC Hebar Pazardzhik players
Association football forwards